Bhagawan Koirala MD, FACC (July 24, 1960) is a Cardiothoracic surgeon, professor and Social worker. He is known for leading the team of Nepalese surgeons that began Open-heart surgery in Nepal. He is considered a good manager of the public hospitals. Apart from leading the technical and clinical teams, he facilitated the free treatment of heart diseases for poor patients: for the children, senior citizen and those in desperate need.

Education and background 
Dr Koirala completed his primary school from his hometown of Palpa. He, then completed “Certificate in General Medicine”, a degree equivalent to that of a Physician assistant, from Institute of Medicine in Kathmandu. His deep interest took him to Kharkiv, Ukraine, where he graduated from Kharkiv Medical Institute in 1989. He credits his teacher during the paramedic course for encouraging him to take career in medicine particularly in the field of cardiac surgery. He did his post-graduation in Cardiothoracic and surgery from National Institute of Cardiovascular Diseases, Dhaka University in 1994. He also has valid USMLE certificate. He did a year of surgical residency at the Baystate Medical Center and later continued as a fellow in cardiac surgery in the same place. He then completed a year of fellowship (2000) in pediatric cardiac surgery from the Sick Children's Hospital, University of Toronto, Canada The Hospital for Sick Children of Toronto in 2000.

Career 

Dr Koirala started his career as young doctor at the Tribhuvan University Teaching Hospital. He worked as a house officer and later as senior house officer at the departments of casualty and Surgery between 1989 and 1991. He later joined the Department of Surgery of the same institute as junior faculty in 1995. He was the key person to have started the Open Heart surgery program at the Teaching Hospital in 1997. After returning from Canada, he led the newly established Shahid Gangalal National Heart Center as the Executive director from 2001 till 2009. Converting an old shoe factory into a fully functional, high volume and efficient heart hospital was an extraordinary job. He was an acting Executive Director of Manmohan Cardiothoracic Vascular and Transplant Center . He later became the Executive Director of Tribhuvan University Teaching Hospital. During his short tenure at the Teaching Hospital as the Executive Director, he cleaned up many irregularities and rescued the hospital from the brink of financial collapse. Professionally, he has been heading the department of cardiac surgery while at the heart hospital and later the department of Cardiothoracic and Vascular Surgery, Tribhuvan University. He has performed or directly supervised over 13,000 heart surgeries between 2001 and 2020. 
Apart from being a surgeon, he is also considered a good manager of public hospitals. His contribution was also in making the expensive cardiac surgeries accessible to the general public by making the heart surgery free for children and elderly. He was awarded with numerous accolades for outstanding service and leadership.

Humanitarian projects
He is involved with numerous social and charitable organizations. His motto is: “no child in this country shall die of heart disease because of poverty”. He is currently the Chairman of Jayanti Memorial Trust, an organization that is dedicated to helping patients with heart diseases. He is also the chairman of Karuna Foundation , that is working on prevention, early detection and rehabilitation of disabilities across the Province 1 of Nepal. His next major undertaking is the Children's Hospital project, called Kathmandu Institute of Child Health (KIOCH) , that aims to establish a multispecialty children's hospital in Kathmandu and later in all provinces of Nepal.

Memberships 

Koirala is the member of numerous medical and scientific organizations:-
Nepal Medical Association
Society of Surgeons in Nepal
Nepal Heart Foundation
Manmohan Cardiothoracic Vascular and Transplant Center
Cardiac Society of Nepal
Jayanti Memorial Trust
Bangladesh Cardiac Society
America Nepal Medical Foundation
Heart Club Nepal
Heart to Heart Nepal
Indian Association of Cardiovascular Thoracic Surgeons
American College of Cardiology (FACC)

Contributions to medicine

Pioneering Open heart surgery in Nepal
Koirala first performed open-heart surgery in 1997. His initiative gave a hope for treating heart diseases inside the country by establishing the first fully operational heart hospital, and also to ensure free service for the needy.

His social initiative came at the time when Nepal completely lacked resources to treat heart patients, and the rate of heart related diseases were increasing in the region. According to a National Report on NCDs and CVDs compiled by NHRC in 2010;

MCVTC, headed by Koirala, is famously known for providing medicines at lower prices than the suggested retail price. He also represents the team of Cardiovascular Surgery for Asia Pacific Society of Cardiology's Scientific Council (May 2011 to Feb 2013).

Honors

Koirala has been felicitated and recognized by various institutions over the years.
Sukirtimaya Rastradeep III, Government of Nepal 2019
Madan Bhandary National award 2017
GoGo Foundation award for good governance, Kathmandu  2016
Mrigendra-Samjhana Medical Trust Honor, 2012
Suprabal Jana Sewasree III, Government of Nepal, 2012
Excellence Achiever's Award, Youth Asia, 2012
Manager of the year, Management Association of Nepal, 2008
Hem Bahadur Malla Honor" for outstanding hospital services, Public Administration Association of Nepal, 2006
Science and Technology Talent Award Grade "A", RONAST, 2005
Dharma Pahari Medical Services award, NMA, 2003
Suprabal Gorkha Dakshinbahu IV, 2001
Birendra-Aisworya Medal for Outstanding Service, 2001
Best Paper Award, IV International Surgical conference of Surgeons in Nepal, 1998
Best Doctor Award, T.U. Teaching Hospital in 1996
Honors for Academic Performance in MD

Personal life

Koirala was born in Palpa, Nepal. He is married and resides in Kathmandu.
Proficient in Nepali, English, Russian, Hindi and Bengali languages.

References

Living people
1960 births
Academic staff of Tribhuvan University
People from Palpa District
People from Kathmandu
Order of Gorkha Dakshina Bahu
Nepalese cardiac surgeons